KAHS-LP (106.5 FM) is a low-power FM high school radio station licensed to Aberdeen, Washington, United States.  The radio station is currently owned by Aberdeen School District #5. The radio station is currently hosted by "KaHs Mad".

References

External links
 

AHS-LP
High school radio stations in the United States
Modern rock radio stations in the United States
AHS-LP
Radio stations established in 2004